Haddington is a hamlet  in the North Kesteven district of Lincolnshire, England. It is in the civil parish of Aubourn with Haddington.

Geography
Haddington is part of the civil parish of Aubourn and Haddington.  It contains a mixture of houses and farm buildings, all brick built, and stands on the north bank of the River Witham 200m from the river. The parish primary school is in South Hykeham.

Earthworks

Between the hamlet and the river are the earthworks of what appears to be a considerable manorial complex or grange. However, it has not so far been possible to carry out the archaeological work needed to positively identify them. The complex consists chiefly of one more or less square moated area of 30m by 40m, surrounded by water-filled ditches. A rectangular platform which lies to the west is partly ditched and approximately 100m across; it has the appearance of part of a formal garden. There is a narrow bank across it 20m from the west end, which may conceal a buried wall; it encloses part of the west end, but is unclear at its southern corner. A 30m length of water may have been a symmetrical pond. The remainder of the earthworks continue on a layout almost at right angles to the rest.  What is only visible is a medieval dovecote.

Community
The ecclesiastical parish is Aubourn with Haddington which is part of The Bassingham Group of the Deanery of Graffoe.  The parish church is St Peter's in Aubourn. As at 2014 the incumbent is the Revd Canon Nick Buck.  The Bassingham group is very active, styling itself Withamside United Parish.

The mobile library visits every month.

There is no scheduled bus route but flexible public transport serves the parish.

References

External links

 Parish Council (shared with Aubourn)
details of permissive site access to the earthworks

Hamlets in Lincolnshire
North Kesteven District
Former civil parishes in Lincolnshire